Identification of inmates in German concentration camps was performed mostly with identification numbers marked on clothing, or later, tattooed on the skin.  More specialized identification in Nazi concentration camps was done with badges on clothing and armbands.

Numbers
A practice was established to tattoo the inmates with identification numbers. Prisoners sent straight to gas chambers didn't receive anything. Initially, in Auschwitz, the camp numbers were sewn on the clothes; with the increased death rate, it became difficult to identify corpses, since clothes were removed from corpses. Therefore, the medical personnel started to write the numbers on the corpses' chests with indelible ink. Difficulties increased in 1941 when Soviet prisoners of war came in masses, and the first few thousand tattoos were applied to them. This was done with a special stamp with the numbers to be tattooed composed of needles. The tattoo was applied to the upper left part of the breast. In March 1942, the same method was used in Birkenau.

The common belief that all concentration camps put tattoos on inmates is not true. The misconception is because Auschwitz inmates were often sent to other camps and liberated from there. They would show a number, but it came from their time at Auschwitz.
Metal stamps turned out to be impractical, and later numbers were tattooed with a single needle on the left forearm.

The tattoo was the prisoner's camp entry number, sometimes with a special symbol added: some Jews had a triangle, and Romani had the letter "Z" (from German Zigeuner for "Gypsy"). In May 1944, the Jewish men received the letters "A" or "B" to indicate particular series of numbers.  For unknown reasons, this number series for women never began again with the "B" series after they had reached the number limit of 20,000 for the "A" series.

Cloth emblems

Colored inverted triangles were used in the concentration camps in the German-occupied countries to identify the reason the prisoners had been placed there. The triangles were made of fabric and were sewn on jackets and shirts of the prisoners. These mandatory badges had specific meanings indicated by their color and shape. The system of badges varied somewhat between the camps. Such emblems helped guards assign tasks to the detainees: for example, a guard at a glance could see if someone were a convicted criminal (green patch) and thus likely of a "tough" temperament suitable for kapo duty. Someone with an "escape suspect" mark usually would not be assigned to work squads operating outside the camp fence.  Someone wearing an F could be called upon to help translate guards' spoken instructions to a trainload of new arrivals from France.

Detainees wearing civilian clothing (more common later in the war) instead of the striped uniforms were often marked with a prominent X on the back. This made for an ersatz prisoner uniform. For permanence, such Xs were made with white oil paint, with sewn-on cloth strips, or were cut (with underlying jacket-liner fabric providing the contrasting color).  Detainees would be compelled to sew their number and (if applicable) a triangle emblem onto the fronts of such X-ed clothing.

Armbands
Armbands were used within the camps to identify kapos, camp "police" (detainees assigned to keep order among their fellow detainees), and certain work crew leaders. Armbands were also in use among detainees sent to perform forced labor in factories outside the camps.

See also
SS blood group tattoo

Notes

Bibliography
 FAQ  of the United States Holocaust Memorial Museum

External links

 

Identification
Tattooing
Terminology of Nazi concentration camps